Prende (also Prenne, Prema, Premte, or Petka) is the dawn-goddess, goddess of love, beauty, fertility, and protector of women, in the Albanian pagan mythology. She is also called Afërdita in reference to Hylli i Dritës, Afêrdita "the Star of Light, Afêrdita" (i.e. Venus, the morning star) and to Ylli i Mbrëmjes, Afërdita (i.e. Venus, the evening star). According to some Albanian traditions, Prende is the daughter of Zojz, the Albanian sky and lighning god.

In Albanian folklore she is referred to as "Lady Prenne" or "Lady of Beauty" (Albanian: Zonja Prende or Zonja e Bukurisë, in Gheg Albanian: Zoja Prenne or Zoja e Bukuris). Her sacred day is Friday, named in Albanian after her: e premte. Her name is though to be a cognate with the Ancient Greek  Persephatta, a variant of Persephone.

Thought to have been worshiped by the Illyrians in antiquity, Prende is identified with the cult of Venus and she was worshipped in northern Albania, especially by the Albanian women, until recent times. Originally a pre-Christian deity, she was called "Saint Veneranda" (Shënepremte), identified by the Catholic Church as Saint Anne, mother of Virgin Mary. She was so popular in Albania that over one in eight of the Catholic churches existing in the late 16th and the early 17th centuries were named after her. Many other historical Catholic and Orthodox churches were dedicated to her in the 18th and 19th centuries.

Name 
The variants of her name are Prende, Prenne, Prema, Premte, or Petka. She is also called Afërdita in reference to Hylli i Dritës, Afêrdita "the Star of Light, Afêrdita" (i.e. Venus, the morning star) and Ylli i Mbrëmjes, Afërdita (i.e. Venus, the evening star). The evening star is referred to as Prëmë (definite Albanian form: Prëma) in some Albanian dialects. The Albanian translation of "evening" is also rendered as πρέμε premë in the Albanian-Greek dictionary of Marko Boçari.

The theonyms have been traced back to the Indo-European *pers-é-bʰ(h₂)n̥t-ih₂ ("she who brings the light through").

Role 
In the Albanian pagan mythology Prende is the goddess of dawn, love, beauty and fertility. She is considered the Albanian equivalent of the Roman Venus, Norse Freyja and Greek Aphrodite. According to some Albanian traditions, Prende is the daughter of Zojz, the Albanian sky and lighning god. Associated with the dawn goddess, the epithet "daughter of the sky-god" is commonly found in Indo-European traditions (cf. H₂éwsōs#Epithets).

Worship 
Prende was worshipped in northern Albania, especially by the Albanian women until recent times. Prende's festival was celebrated on July 26 every year, and her devotees would don beautiful clothing and would set out a mortar and pestle as a representation of sexual union.

According to folk beliefs, swallows, called Pulat e Zojës "the Lady's Birds", pull Prende across the sky in her chariot. Swallows are connected to the chariot by the rainbow (Ylberi), which the people also call Brezi or Shoka e Zojës "the Lady's Belt".

When Albania became Christianized in antiquity, Prende was identified by the Catholic Church as Saint Anne, mother of Virgin Mary, and was called "Saint Veneranda" (known in Gheg dialect as Prenne, Perende or Petka). Another Albanian Christian saint thought by some to have a non-Christian origin is Gjin.

Prende was so popular in Albania that of the some 275 Catholic churches recorded to have existed in Albania in the late 16th and the early 17th centuries, 33 were named after her, more than to any other saint except Virgin Mary and Saint Nicholas. Many other historical Catholic and Orthodox churches were dedicated to her in the 18th and 19th centuries. In the Kurbin valley pilgrimages to the church of Saint Veneranda were common among both Christians and Muslims. There people went also in the hope of a cure for mental illness.

As is usual in many cultures, in Albania the day sacred to the goddess of love is Friday, named in the Albanian language after her: dita e premte.

See also

 Albanian mythology
 Illyrian religion
 En
 Perëndi
 Venus
 Freyja

References

Bibliography 

Albanian mythology
Illyrian goddesses
Dawn goddesses
Stellar deities
Love and lust goddesses
European goddesses
Beauty goddesses
Paleo-Balkan mythology